Events from the year 1745 in France.

Incumbents 
Monarch: Louis XV

Events
 
 
 

 May 11 – War of the Austrian Succession: Battle of Fontenoy – French forces defeat an Anglo-Dutch-Hanoverian army including the Black Watch.
 July 9 – War of the Austrian Succession: Battle of Melle – The French are victorious in an engagement against the Pragmatic Allies.
 September 14 – Madame de Pompadour is officially presented in the court of Louis XV of France.

Births
 

 January 6 – Jacques-Étienne Montgolfier, French inventor (d. 1799)
 April 20 – Philippe Pinel, French physician (d. 1826)
 July 8 – Sara Banzet, educator and diarist (d. 1774)

Deaths
 

 May 22 – François-Marie, 1st duc de Broglie, French military leader (b. 1671)
 December 8 – Étienne Fourmont, French orientalist (b. 1683)
 December 19 – Jean-Baptiste van Loo, French painter (b. 1684)

See also

References

1740s in France